Pedro Martín Enrique (born Valladolid, 1987) is a Spanish rugby union player. He plays as a fullback or as a wing.

He comes from a family with a large rugby following. He started his career at Valladolid Rugby Asociación Club. His current team is the French side Aviron Bayonnais in the Top 14 league.

He counts 13 caps for Spain, with 1 try scored, 5 points in aggregate, since 2006.

References

External links
Pedro Martín International Statistics

1987 births
Living people
Spanish rugby union players
Rugby union fullbacks
Rugby union wings
Spain international rugby union players
Spanish expatriate rugby union players
Expatriate rugby union players in France
Spanish expatriate sportspeople in France
Sportspeople from Valladolid